Frederico Westphalen is a southern Brazilian town located in the state of Rio Grande do Sul.

History
The colonization of the Alto Uruguay region began in 1905. The first inhabitants were attracted by the natural resources of the region, specially suited for hunting purposes. In 1919 the first access road was created to connect the town with the neighbor city of Iraí. The town was officially created in December the 12th, 1954. The majority of the population descends from Italian immigrants.

Economy
The economy of the region is based on the food processing industries, furniture industries and agriculture.

Neighbor cities
Frederico Westphalen has frontiers with the towns  of Iraí, Vicente Dutra, Caiçara, Vista Alegre, Taquaruçu do Sul, Seberi, Cristal do Sul and Ametista do Sul.

Access
Two roads give access to the town: BR-386 and RS-150

Media
The town has two local newspapers, one called O Alto Uruguai and other called Folha do Noroeste, and two radio stations, Rádio Luz e Alegria and Rádio Comunitária.

Climate
The climate is Sub-tropical with two well defined seasons: Summer (October to April) and Winter (May to September).

Universities and colleges
Frederico Westphalen has one university: URI - Universidade Regional Integrada do Alto Uruguay e Missões - University Website, and an extension of the UFSM, Universidade Federal de Santa Maria, the CESNORS (Centro de Educação Superior Norte do Rio Grande do Sul).

Schools
There are six schools on the town: Colégio Agrícola (technical school), Colégio Nossa Sra. Auxiliadora, Colégio Estadual José Cannelas, Escola de Educação Básica Sepé Tiaraju, Escola Afonso Pena and Escola Cardeal Roncalli.

See also
 German-Brazilian
 Riograndenser Hunsrückisch

References

External links

 Official home page (in Portuguese).
 Local University (in Portuguese).

Municipalities in Rio Grande do Sul